MoviePlex, stylized as movieplex since 2006, is an American premium cable and satellite television network owned by the Starz Inc. subsidiary of Lions Gate Entertainment and headquartered at the Meridian International Business Center complex in Meridian, Colorado. Launched on 1 January 1997 as Plex: Encore 1, its programming consists of recent, as well as older theatrically released motion pictures. It is the sister channel of Starz and Starz Encore.

History
MoviePlex originally launched on January 1, 1997 as Plex: Encore 1; it replaced both INTRO Television (originally called TV! Network until September 1995), a cable channel that was launched in June 1994 by Liberty Media (initial owner of MoviePlex through a joint venture with parent company Tele-Communications, Inc.), which aired "sampler" blocks of programming from other cable channels without full coverage; and Encore Plus, a secondary Encore network that had utilized what came to be MoviePlex's format. The channel also had some original content. The relaunched network was originally referred to as "Plex" in promotions, with the numbering system used by the Encore networks at the time giving it the designation "Encore 1"; the network assumed the MoviePlex name in the fall of 1997.

MoviePlex's original programming format carried on that of its predecessor, as the channel featured day-long blocks of various programs from Encore's themed multiplex channels each day of the week, with a different channel being showcased each day; prior to MoviePlex's conversion into a standalone channel, it broadcast programming from children-oriented WAM! (now Starz Encore Family) on Sundays, Love Stories (now Starz Encore Classics) on Mondays, the main Encore channel on Tuesdays, Westerns (now Starz Encore Westerns) on Wednesdays, Action (now Starz Encore Action) on Thursdays, Mystery (now Starz Encore Mystery) on Fridays and True Stories (later Encore Drama; now Starz Encore Black) on Saturdays. Programming was shown on a one-hour delay from its presentation on that respective Encore channel, with R-rated films omitted from MoviePlex's schedule and substituted with alternative G-, PG- and PG-13-rated film titles. Presumably, this was to give viewers a chance to try out each channel of the multiplex before subscribing to it; alternatively, it also served as an outlet for some of the multiplex programming as some cable providers did not carry them all.

On June 2, 1997, TCI announced a deal in which it transferred majority ownership of its Encore Media Group subsidiary to Liberty Media, a transaction done in part to shield TCI from effects resulting from the significant profit losses incurred by Starz! following that channel's launch – TCI retained a minority 20% ownership interest until its 1999 merger with AT&T Corporation, when Liberty Media assumed full ownership of the Encore Media Group.

On April 4, 2006 at 12:00 a.m. Eastern Time, MoviePlex launched two companion multiplex channels: IndiePlex, which is dedicated to independent films, and RetroPlex, which focuses on older movies from the 1980s and earlier. The first movie to be aired on IndiePlex was the Wim Wenders-directed western Paris, Texas; RetroPlex launched with the Samuel Fuller-directed drama Pickup on South Street.

On November 19, 2009, Liberty Media spun off Starz, Encore and MoviePlex into a separate public tracking stock named Liberty Starz. On August 1, 2011, MoviePlex adopted its own separate programming schedule, ending the sampler block format of films and other programs seen on the various Encore multiplex channels. On August 8, 2012, Liberty Media announced that it would spin off Liberty Starz into its own separate publicly traded company. The spin-off of the subsidiary was completed on January 11, 2013, with Liberty Starz changing its name to Starz Inc. as a result.

On April 5, 2016, Starz was rebranded and added all the Encore channels to its moniker, therefore increasing the Starz channel lineup to 14 Starz movie channels. Its main channel was rebranded "Starz Encore" and carries Starz reruns in addition to films.

On June 30, 2016, Lionsgate agreed to acquire Starz Inc. for $4.4 billion in cash and stock; the acquisition was completed five months later on December 8.

Channels

List of channels
Depending on the service provider, MoviePlex provides up to six multiplex channels – three 24-hour multiplex channels, which are simulcast in both standard definition and high definition – as well as a subscription video-on-demand service (MoviePlex On Demand).

MoviePlex broadcasts its primary and multiplex channels on Pacific and Eastern Time Zones schedules. The premium film service Starz and Encore, which are both also owned by Starz Inc., operate as separate services – although subscribers to MoviePlex do not necessarily have to subscribe to either of the two sister services.

RetroPlex
RetroPlex is an American premium television network which features older motion pictures, and is a spinoff of the MoviePlex and is owned by Starz, LLC. The headquarters of RetroPlex and its sister channels MoviePlex and IndiePlex are located on the Meridian International Business Center complex with Starz and Encore in Meridian, Colorado.

RetroPlex is available nationally on Dish Network and regionally on select cable systems including  Comcast, Atlantic Broadband and Verizon FiOS.  RetroPlex and IndiePlex are also simulcast in 1080i high definition on Dish Network.

Other services

MoviePlex HD
MoviePlex HD is a high definition simulcast feed of MoviePlex that broadcasts in the 1080i resolution format. IndiePlex and RetroPlex also maintain their own respective HD simulcasts, IndiePlex HD and RetroPlex HD. Unusual for a premium service, its multiplex channels have been available in HD for several years; however, the main MoviePlex channel in contrast did not have a high definition simulcast feed of its own until 2013. MoviePlex HD, IndiePlex HD and RetroPlex HD are currently available nationally on Dish Network, and regionally on certain cable providers.

MoviePlex On Demand
MoviePlex On Demand is MoviePlex's video on demand service, which launched on April 4, 2006. MoviePlex On Demand's rotating program selection incorporates select new titles that are added each Friday, alongside existing program titles held over from the previous one to two weeks. It is currently available to Comcast subscribers.

MoviePlex Play
MoviePlex Play was a website and mobile app that provided feature film content from MoviePlex available for streaming in standard or high definition. It was available to MoviePlex subscribers of AT&T U-verse and Cox Communications until it was merged with Starz.com on April 5, 2016. The MoviePlex Play iPad, iPhone and iPod Touch app was first released on December 18, 2012, followed by the release of the app for Android devices on May 7, 2013.

Programming
Although the channel is not purposely formatted as a family-oriented service, MoviePlex's primary channel does not broadcast films with a Motion Picture Association of America rating of "R" or a TV Parental Guideline rating of "TV-MA". This dates back to the channel's original format of running sampler blocks of Encore's multiplex channels, MoviePlex did not technically simulcast each Encore channel's programs as a result, scheduling films during each day's schedule that differed from those seen on the Encore networks in some timeslots. In contrast, IndiePlex and RetroPlex will televise films with those assigned ratings.

Movie library
MoviePlex – through Starz – maintains exclusive first-run film licensing agreements with Sony Pictures Entertainment (since January 2005; including content from subsidiaries Columbia Pictures, Sony Pictures Classics, Screen Gems, Destination Films, Triumph Films, TriStar Pictures, and Sony Pictures Animation), Anchor Bay Entertainment, and Warren Miller Films (since 1997).

The first-run film output agreement with Walt Disney Pictures expired after December 2015, with the Netflix streaming service assuming the pay television rights in January 2016 (excluding films released by Touchstone Pictures (now 20th Century Studios), which will be retained by Starz through a separate contract). On April 8, 2021, Sony Pictures Entertainment announced that they would not be renewing the agreement with Starz in favor of a new first-run agreement with Netflix. On July 15, 2021, Starz reached a licensing deal with Universal Pictures for first-run movies 18 months after they stream on Peacock and Prime Video respectively. The first-run film output agreement with the Warren Miller output deal was renewed for ten years on October 19, 2009.

MoviePlex also shows sub-runs – runs of films that have already received broadcast or syndicated television airings – of theatrical films from Walt Disney Studios Motion Pictures (including content from subsidiaries Walt Disney Pictures, Pixar Animation Studios, Walt Disney Animation Studios, Marvel Studios, Disneynature, 20th Century Studios and Touchstone Pictures; for films released prior to 2016), Warner Bros. Entertainment (including content from subsidiaries New Line Cinema, Turner Entertainment (both for films released prior to 2005), and Castle Rock Entertainment), Universal Pictures (including content from subsidiaries Universal Animation Studios, Focus Features, and DreamWorks Animation all for films released prior to 2003), Metro-Goldwyn-Mayer (including content from subsidiaries United Artists, Orion Pictures, and The Samuel Goldwyn Company), Miramax Films (for films released prior to 2009), Paramount Pictures, Hollywood Pictures, Revolution Studios, Overture Films, Yari Film Group, and the eventually network sister company Lions Gate Entertainment.
 
In January 1997, MoviePlex secured a licensing agreement with Paramount Pictures, broadcasting over 300 movie titles. Paramount's first contract with MoviePlex expired in December 2005. In March 2013, MoviePlex reassumed sub-run rights to Paramount Pictures' feature film releases. The first film broadcast through this deal was Sunset Boulevard. Additional Paramount Pictures releases began to be broadcast on MoviePlex starting the following month, such as The Errand Boy, The Stooge and The Bellboy.

Carriage
MoviePlex is available nationally on Dish Network, and regionally on select cable systems including Comcast Xfinity, Cox Communications, Charter Spectrum and AT&T U-verse. IndiePlex and RetroPlex are currently available on Dish Network, Xfinity, Atlantic Broadband and Verizon FiOS.

References

External links
 

Starz Entertainment Group
Television channels and stations established in 1997
Television networks in the United States
Commercial-free television networks
Movie channels in the United States